Mandalynn Carlson (born August 25, 1999) is an American actress from Taylor, Michigan whose first film appearance was a supporting role in the 2011 action biopic Machine Gun Preacher, with Gerard Butler. Leaving Michigan for Hollywood, Carlson has found success with supporting and lead roles in dozens of independent films and television shows, including Greys Anatomy and CSI: NY.

Career 
Carlson began her acting career in 2010 with a supporting role in Machine Gun Preacher alongside Gerard Butler, Michael Shannon, and Michelle Monaghan. She continued to do local projects in Detroit, including the period piece, Mary's Buttons (2012), which was based on a true story and Naked Angel (2014) with James Duval and Debra Wilson. She co-starred on an episode of CSI: NY with Jadin Gould, Olivia Stuck and Emily Robinson, as teenagers who were victims of a senseless shooting. She was in a skit on Jimmy Kimmel Live! in 2012.

In 2013, Carlson worked on her first pilot for NBC, Brenda Forever, where she was the lead alongside Ellie Kemper and Ken Marino. The pilot was directed by David Wain and written by David Lampson and Andrew Leeds. NBC passed on the pilot and Carlson went on to work on Shonda Rhimes ABC show Scandal with Kerry Washington and Lisa Edelstein. She plays the product of a love affair between a high powered CEO and a nominee for a Supreme Court Judge in the episode Top of the Hour. Fans created the hashtag, #hamandpineapple, to interact with Carlson during live tweeting.

Carlson worked with the same producer of Mary's Buttons on another film, Small Town Santa (2014) with Dean Cain and Christine Lakin. Her father is played by Cain, a small town sheriff who is angry at the world because he is away from his daughter on Christmas Eve. Carlson worked with Cain again on her next film, A Horse for Summer (2015), where she played the lead role of Summer Dean, a troubled teen who bounces from foster home to foster home while her mother is in jail. She is eventually sent to live with her uncle whom she has never met. Trouble follows her there as well and she forces Cain to make a hard choice on whether to let her stay or send her back to the city. This film was Nancy Criss's directorial feature debut. Christopher Atkins and Lee Meriwether also star in the film.

In 2015, Carlson worked on Deadly Sanctuary (2015), her third film with Dean Cain and second with Nancy Criss. The film stars Daniel Baldwin, Eric Roberts, and Paul Greene (actor). She then went on to work on A Horse Tail where she has a lead role playing Patrick Muldoon's daughter. It also stars Charisma Carpenter and Dominique Swain. Carlson and Atkins worked on an indie film together less than two years later, titled The Sparrows: Nesting (2015) which has been touring the film festivals. The film stars Kevin Sorbo, James Duval, Judy Norton Taylor, John Savage (actor) and Valenzia Algarin.

She finished filming Fishes 'N Loaves: Heaven Sent where Patrick Muldoon plays her father in a feature film for the second time. Carlson's mother is played by Dina Meyer and her brother is Brandon Tyler Russell. The film is a faith based film about a pastor that moves his family from the big city to a small town and the shocking change between the two and is set to be released in 2016.

Mandalynn was on the 2015 season 12 premiere of Grey's Anatomy playing the role of Jessica Tanner in scenes with Sara Ramirez, Justin Chambers and Kelly McCreary which dealt with teen suicide and bullying.

Carlson plays Sam Lambert in Roadside Stars paired Mandalynn with acting legend and academy award nominee Candy Clark from American Graffiti, Gene Loveland and Boti Bliss of CSI:Miami fame.

In 2017, Carlson stepped behind the camera to direct an episode of Creepy Chronicles. "The Keeper", was episode 102 in the series which debuted on Amazon Prime. Carlson was also executive producer on episode 2 and episode 3 called "Pool Party", under her production company Smash the Glass Pictures.

Mandalynn joined Pure Flix (studio)'s series, Hilton Head Island, in season 2, recurring as troubled teen Katy Trisk. The drama, nicknamed a "hope opera" as it steers away from using language, sex and violence in the story, follows the prominent Trisk family who runs the fictional ISLE Television Network in South Carolina's most notable resort town. The series stars Donna Mills of Knots Landing, Michael Swan from As the World Turns, Emmy-winning actress Crystal Hunt of Guiding Light, and Antonio Sabato Jr of General Hospital. Season two adds Linda Gray of Dallas (1978 TV series) fame.

Personal life 
Carlson was born in Detroit, Michigan on August 25, 1999, the only child of Eric and Sherri Carlson. She started performing in an annual family play at the age of two years with her two cousins and her grandmother Pauline Ettore, a councilwoman for the City of Taylor. Her parents owned Michigan Crafty & Motion Picture Catering which sparked her interest in the industry.

Homeschooled since the 6th grade, Carlson started her first year of college at the age of 15 years. As a college sophomore at 16 years old, she was inducted into Phi Theta Kappa with a 4.0 gpa.

Community involvement 
She is an outspoken activist against bullying, coming from the perspective of "living in that moment" during elementary and middle school. The bullying by schoolmates in grades 4-6 lead her parents to choose home schooling for Mandalynn, allowing her to work at an accelerated pace as well as provided time in her schedule for training and acting. In 2013-14, Mandalynn was a guest speaker on the TBTG Music Is My Language Tour around Southern California schools, bringing a positive message about acceptance and advocating against bullying.

Carlson actively speaks with young girls about self-image and has written articles about the topic. She visits underprivileged children in the Watts projects, supports the Ronald McDonald House of Pasadena fundraisers and visits chronically ill children at Children's Hospital Los Angeles.

Filmography

Film

Television

Awards and nominations

References

idplschool

External links 
 
 
 

Living people
1999 births
People from Taylor, Michigan
Actresses from Michigan
American film actresses
American television actresses
American child actresses
21st-century American women